Czosnowo may refer to the following villages:
Czosnowo, Pomeranian Voivodeship (north Poland)
Czosnowo, Warmian-Masurian Voivodeship (north-east Poland)